The following is a list of composers from Spain:

A
Marcial del Adalid y Gurréa (1826–1881), composer 
 Dionisio Aguado y García (1784–1849), composer and guitarist
 Sebastian Aguilera de Heredia (1561–1627), composer and organist
 Isaac Albéniz (1860–1909), late Romantic composer and pianist, wrote nationalist works such as Iberia
 Mateo Albéniz (1755–1831), composer 
 Manuel Alejandro (born 1969), contemporary song composer
 Francisco Alonso (1887–1948), composer of zarzuela
 Vicente Amigo (born 1967), composer
 Juan de Anchieta (1462–1523), composer
 Juan Crisóstomo Arriaga (1806–1826), Romantic composer, nicknamed the "Spanish Mozart" before dying at age 19
 Emilio Arrieta (1821–1894), composer

B
 Salvador Bacarisse (1898–1963), composer
 Carlos Baguer (1768–1808), composer and organist
 Leonardo Balada (born 1933), composer, naturalized American
 Francisco Asenjo Barbieri (1823–1894), composer of zarzuela
 Sergio Blardony (born 1965), composer
 Tomás Bretón (1850–1923), composer
 Pablo Bruna (1611–1679), composer and organist

C
 Johannes Cornago (c. 1400–after 1475)
 Juan Bautista Cabanilles (1644–1712), composer and organist
 Antonio de Cabezón (1510–1566), composer and organist
 Ramón Carnicer (1789–1855), composer
 Narciso Casanovas (1747–1799), composer
 Ruperto Chapí (1851–1909), composer
 Federico Chueca (1846–1908), composer
 Gaspar Cassado (1897–1966), composer and cellist
 Juan J. Colomer (born 1966), composer
 Francisco Correa de Arauxo (1584–1654), composer and organist

D
 Sebastián Durón (1660–1716), composer
 Gustavo Díaz-Jerez (born 1970), composer

E
 Juan del Encina (1468–1529), composer
Óscar Esplá (1886–1976), composer

F
 Manuel de Falla (1876–1946), 20th-century composer, best known for The Three-Cornered Hat
 Mateo Flecha (1481–1553), composer

G
Antón García Abril (1933-2021), composer
Manuel García the Senior (1775–1832), also Manuel del Pópulo Vicente Rodriguez García
 Roberto Gerhard (1896–1970), composer
 Enrique Granados (1867–1916), nationalist composer and pianist, influenced later composers such as Manuel de Falla
 Francisco Guerrero (1528–1599), composer
 Jesús Guridi (1886–1961), composer

H
 Cristóbal Halffter (1930–2021), composer and conductor
 Ernesto Halffter (1905–1989), composer
Rodolfo Halffter (1900–1987), composer
Luis Venegas de Henestrosa (c. 1510–1570)
 Juan Hidalgo de Polanco (1614–1685), composer and harpist
 Joaquin Homs (1906–2006), composer

I
 Sebastián Iradier (1809–1865), composer

L
 Ricard Lamote de Grignon (1899–1965), composer
 Ramon Lazkano (born 1968), composer
 Antoni Lliteres Carrió (1673–1747), composer of zarzuela
 Miguel Llobet (1878–1938), guitarist and composer
 Alonso Lobo (1555–1617), composer
 Francisco Losada (1612-1667), composer and conductor
 Paco de Lucía (1947–2014), composer
 Hermes Luaces (born 1975), composer
 Pablo Luna (1879–1942), composer of zarzuela

M
 Josep Mestres Quadreny (born 1929), composer
 Tomás Marco (born 1942), composer
 Luis de Milán (c. 1500–1561), composer and vihuelist
 Federico Mompou (1893–1987), composer
 Ramón Montoya (1880–1949), composer
 Xavier Montsalvatge (1912–2002), composer
 José Luis Morán, (born 1963), composer
 Cristóbal de Morales (1500–1553), composer
 Federico Moreno Torroba (1891–1982), composer
 Alonso Mudarra (1510–1580), composer

N
 Luis de Narváez (fl. 1526–1549), composer and vihuelist
 José Luis Narom(born 1963), composer
 Pablo Nassarre (1650–1730), composer, organist, and theorist
 José Nieto (b. 1942)
 Jaime Nunó (1824–1908), composer

O
 Fernando Obradors (1897–1945), composer
 Gonzalo de Olavide (1934–2005), composer
 María Teresa Oller (1920-2018), composer and folklorist
 Diego Ortiz (1510–1570), composer and theorist

P
 Luis de Pablo (1930–2021)
 Felipe Pedrell (1841–1922)
 Joan Baptista Pla (1720–1773)
 David del Puerto (born 1964)
 Joan Pau Pujol (1570–1626)

R
 Niño Ricardo (1904–1972), composer
 Joaquín Rodrigo (1901–1999), 20th-century composer, wrote the Concierto de Aranjuez for classical guitar and orchestra
 Antonio Rodríguez de Hita (1722–1787), composer
 Antonio Ruiz-Pipò (1934–1997), 20th-century composer for the guitar

S
 Sabicas (1912–1990), composer
 José María Sánchez-Verdú (born 1968), composer
 Manolo Sanlúcar (born 1943), composer
 Gaspar Sanz (1640–1710), Baroque era guitar composer
 Pablo de Sarasate (1844–1908), Romantic era virtuoso violinist and composer
 José Serrano (1873–1941), composer
 Juan Sesé y Balaguer (1736–1801), composer
 Antonio Soler (1729–1783), wrote sonatas and concertos for the harpsichord and organ
 Fernando Sor (1778–1839), best known as a guitarist and composer for the guitar, he also wrote three symphonies, ballets, a mass, an opera etc.  
 Pablo Sorozábal (1897–1988), composer
 Bohdan Syroyid (1995–), Ukrainian-born Spanish composer

T
 Francisco Tárrega (1852–1909), Romantic era guitarist and composer
 Eduardo Torres (1872–1934), Late Romantic composer of organ works and guitar pieces
 Joaquín Turina (1882–1949), composer of chamber music, piano works, guitar pieces, and songs

U
 Juan de Urrede (c. 1430–after 1482)
 José María Usandizaga (1887–1915)

V
 Manuel Valls (1920–1984), composer
 Joaquín Valverde Durán (1846–1910), composer of zarzuelas
 Joaquín "Quinito" Valverde Sanjuán (1875–1918), composer of zarzuelas
 Octavio Vazquez (born 1972), composer
 Tomás Luis de Victoria (1548–1611), composer
 Pedro Vilarroig (born 1954), contemporary neo-tonal composer.
 Sebastián de Vivanco (1551–1622), composer
 Amadeo Vives (1871–1932), composer

Z
Valentín Zubiaurre (1837–1914), composer

See also
Chronological list of Spanish classical composers

References

Spain
 List
Composers
Spanish music-related lists